Bullet money or bullet coins, known in Thai as  (also spelled pod duang, etc.), were a type of coinage historically used in Siam (now Thailand) and its predecessor kingdoms. They were almost exclusively made of silver, in the form of a bar bent into a roundish shape, and stamped with certain marks. Photduang were issued according to the baht system of weights, known among Westerners as the tical, which is the basis of the modern Thai currency. Their earliest common use is from the Sukhothai Kingdom (13th–15th centuries), and they were used by Ayutthaya and its successor kingdoms Thonburi and Rattanakosin up until 27 October 1904, when their use was discontinued in favour of flat coinage.

Gallery

See also
Lat money, a similar currency used in Lan Xang
Piloncitos, used in the Philippines

References

Further reading

History of money
Economic history of Thailand
Economy of the Ayutthaya Kingdom